Sunshine Alley is a 1917 American silent drama film directed by John W. Noble and produced by Samuel Goldwyn. It was written by screenwriter Mary Rider specifically as a vehicle for actress Mae Marsh.

Plot 
The film—which was lauded for its sympathy toward animals—centers on a relationship between a young woman who helps out at her grandfather's bird store and a millionaire's son.

Cast
 Mae Marsh as Nell
 Robert Harron as Ned
 Dion Titheradge as Carlo
 James A. Furey as Harbost (credited as J.A. Furey)
 Edward See as Cobbler (credited as Ed See)
 John Charles as Ben Davis
 William T. Carleton as Mr. Morris (credited as W.T. Carleton)
 Isabel Berwin as Isabel Berwin
 Jack Grey as Detective

References

External links

1917 films
Films directed by John W. Noble
Goldwyn Pictures films
American black-and-white films
American silent feature films
1910s American films